Juan de Navas (ca. 1650–1719) was a Spanish baroque composer and harpist. As court harpist to Charles II of Spain he was sought as approver of Torres y Martínez Bravo's treatise on thoroughbass.

Works, editions and recordings
villancicos - Angelicas escuadras and others.
tonos humanos in the Guerra Manuscript and other sources.

Recordings:
Ay, divino amor - on Cantadas de pasión Maria Luz Álvarez, Accentus Austria, Thomas Wimmer. Arcana 2005.

References

Spanish Baroque composers
1650s births
1719 deaths
Spanish male classical composers
18th-century classical composers
18th-century male musicians